Kamina Funkstation was a wireless transmitter in the German-occupied colony of Togoland (now Togo) in West Africa. The wireless station was built by Telefunken near the village of Kamina, in Togoland, where the nearest large settlement was Atakpamé. The transmitter was built by Telefunken, on behalf of the German government from 1911 to 1914. The station was designed as a node and switching point for other German colonial radio stations. Shortly after the beginning of the First World War, Togoland was invaded by British and French forces from the neighbouring colonies of Gold Coast (Ghana) to the west and French Dahomey (Benin) to the east. The station was destroyed by the operators to prevent it from coming under British and French control.

See also
 Kamina Barracks

References

Further reading

External links
 Die Funkstation von Kamina

 WW1: The crucial battle for Togo - BBC World News

World War I
Mass media in Togo
Towers in Togo
Plateaux Region, Togo